Adam Petersson (born 25 August 2000) is a Swedish footballer who plays as a midfielder for Mjällby in the Allsvenskan.

Career

Mjällby
A graduate of the club's youth academy, Petersson made his league debut for the club on 22 June 2020, coming on as a 66th-minute substitute for David Batanero in a 2–2 draw with Göteborg.

References

External links
Adam Petersson at Soccer Base

2000 births
Living people
Mjällby AIF players
Allsvenskan players
Swedish footballers
Association football midfielders